PabloDraw is a cross-platform text editor designed for creating ANSI and ASCII art, similar to that of its MS-DOS-based predecessors; ACiDDraw (1994) and TheDraw (1986).

A notable feature of PabloDraw is its integrated multi-user editing support, making it the first groupware ANSI/ASCII editor in existence.  This allows artists from around the world with an internet connection to cooperatively draw (and chat) together. These creations are referred to as "joints", or jointly created productions, and have radically changed the way these artists collaborate in this form.

This editor is capable of handling most standard text mode formats such as ANSI, ASCII and Binary.  Additionally it supports different aspect ratios such as the 80×25 and 80×50 (25 and 50-line text graphics modes, respectively) and emulates the Amiga Topaz font for artists who prefer to draw using that specific extended character set. In addition to ASCII and ANSI art, PabloDraw can also be used to create RIPscrip vector graphics .

See also

 Collaborative software

External links
 PabloDraw Editor homepage
 PabloView for Windows ANSI/ASCII viewer for Microsoft Windows; requires .NET Framework

ASCII art
Artscene
Windows text-related software
Windows graphics-related software